Jean Maritz (1680–1743), also Johan Maritz, was a Swiss inventor, born in Burgdorf, Canton of Bern, who moved to France, becoming "Commissaire des Fontes" at Strasbourg (Commissioner of the King's Foundry), and invented the vertical drilling machine, as well as the horizontal drilling machine for cannons in the 18th century. His inventions revolutionized cannon-making, and became a key component of the de Vallière system, and contributed to the development of the later Gribeauval system.

Jean Maritz first invented a vertical drilling machine for cannons while in France in 1713. The vertical drilling method however, in which a cannon was slowly lowered over a turning drill, was very delicate, very time consuming and rather imprecise.

He further developed a method for the horizontal drilling of cannons around 1734. These methods involved the drilling of a bore from a solid casting.

These inventions were vast improvements over previous methods, which involved founding the cannon around a clay core, which was removed after founding, leading to imprecision and shifting of the core, and therefore poor performance.

The inventions of Jean Maritz gave perfectly straight bores which could perfectly fit the ball diameter, and therefore vastly increase efficiency. In the horizontal method developed by Maritz, the solid-cast cannon itself was revolved horizontally, while the drill remained static, in a method similar to that of a lathe.

The son of Jean Maritz, Jean Maritz II (1712-1790), who had worked with his father on the development of boring, became Inspector General of Gun Foundries in 1755. He is credited with the innovation of the horizontal boring machine which can be seen in these images:
https://www.photo.rmn.fr/archive/06-526760-2C6NU0PLJAGF.html
https://www.photo.rmn.fr/archive/06-526761-2C6NU0PLJPKE.html
https://www.photo.rmn.fr/archive/06-526762-2C6NU0PLJZSL.html

The Maritz method would be central in the development of the Gribeauval cannon.

See also
John Wilkinson

Notes

1680 births
1743 deaths
People from Burgdorf, Switzerland
Artillery of France